Paul (Paulo) Kanoa ( – November 10, 1885) was a Hawaiian high chief who served many political posts in the Kingdom of Hawaii, including Governor of Kauaʻi from 1847 to 1877.

Biography
Kanoa was born around the year 1802 in Kahaluu in South Kona on the island of Hawaii. His parents were Kapuohoula and Kepaa. His family descended from the Molokai chiefess Kaneʻalai. Kekūanāoʻa, the father of Kamehameha IV and Kamehameha V, and Boaz Mahune, the author of the Hawaiian Declaration of Rights of 1839, were his cousins. In his youth, Kanoa lived for a time with Gerrit P. Judd, an American missionary and advisor to King Kamehameha III, and also accompanied Rev. Hiram Bingham I on two missionary trips to Kauaʻi.

He started his political career as a secretary of his cousin Kekūanāoʻa, the Governor of Oʻahu. In 1842, Kanoa was elected along with L. K. Halaʻi as Oʻahu's representative to Legislature of Hawaii at Lahaina, the capital at the time. Kanoa served as a clerk in the 1842 session of the legislature. In 1845, he was appointed an official member of the House of Nobles, the upper house of the legislature. In order to replace the diminishing number of aliʻi nui, it was decided on April 2, 1845, to vote lower-ranking chiefs who were "men of learning" into the council and elevate their chiefly statuses. Kanoa was among the first group of six lesser chiefs chosen. He also served as a member of the Privy Council from October 21, 1846, to February 23, 1874. In 1847, Paul Kanoa was appointed to succeed Princess Kekauʻōnohi as the Royal Governor of Kauaʻi, a position he held until his resignation on January 4, 1877. Unlike his predecessors who ruled like conquerors, his rule, although firm, was characterized by cooperation with the resurgent native chiefs of Kauaʻi. During this period, the sugar industry became the dominant enterprise on the island and businessmen such as Paul Isenberg and William Hyde Rice profited from close affiliation with Governor Kanoa. In his long political career, Kanoa served under the reigns of five monarchs: Kamehameha III, Kamehameha IV and Kamehameha V, Lunalilo and Kalākaua.

Death and legacy
Paul Kanoa died at the age of 83, on November 10, 1885, after falling from a second-storey room, in his Honolulu residence. After a state funeral on November 15, he was buried in a family vault at the cemetery of Kawaiahaʻo Church. He was survived by his widow Kahanaauwai, hānai son Paul P. Kanoa, who was also Governor of Kauaʻi from 1881 to 1886, and his only daughter Deborah Maunakilika Kanoa, who became his sole heir. Owning extensive lands on Kauaʻi extending from Koloa to Hanamaulu, he built a home on the hills overlooking the beach of Nawiliwili Bay, around the present day Niumalu Beach Park. It later was converted into a courthouse and county offices and became the Kauai High School around 1914.

In 1931, historian Ethel Moseley Damon wrote about Governor Kanoa:
Governor Kanoa was one of the outstanding figures in Kauai society... A commanding figure physically, with a strong yet responsive face, and a shrewd though genial expression, Paul Kanoa was also a commanding figure in his sturdy uprightness and his unswerving devotion to duty and honor as he understood them.

References

Bibliography

Hawaiian Kingdom politicians
Governors of Kauai
Members of the Hawaiian Kingdom House of Nobles
Members of the Hawaiian Kingdom Privy Council
1802 births
1885 deaths
Accidental deaths from falls
Hawaiian nobility
People from Hawaii (island)
Native Hawaiian politicians
Burials at Kawaiahaʻo Church
Nobility of the Americas